Murray Valley Highway is a  state highway located in Victoria and New South Wales, Australia. The popular tourist route mostly follows the southern bank of the Murray River and effectively acts as the northernmost highway in Victoria. For all but the western end's last three kilometres, the highway is allocated route B400.

Route

The western end of Murray Valley Highway commences at the intersection with Sturt Highway just outside Euston, New South Wales and heads south to cross the Murray River over the Robinvale-Euston bridge at Robinvale and into Victoria; the western end of route B400 starts here. The highway continues in a south-easterly direction, tracking close to the southern bank of the Murray River for the majority of its length until it reaches Wodonga, before heading in an easterly direction until it eventually reaches the foothills of the Great Dividing Range at Corryong. The road beyond crosses the border east into New South Wales as Alpine Way, to eventually reach Khancoban and Jindabyne.

Most of the highway is fairly straight and flat, much of it through irrigated farmland. It becomes hillier and more winding east of Wodonga, with a moderately steep mountain pass near Shelley, midway between Tallangatta and Corryong.

The major towns along the route are Robinvale, Swan Hill, Kerang, Cohuna, Echuca, Nathalia, Strathmerton, Cobram, Yarrawonga, Rutherglen, Wodonga, Tallangatta and Corryong.

History
Murray (River) Valley Road was built in the late 1920s and early 1930s by the Country Roads Board of Victoria as part of a program of rural roads to facilitate development of the more remote parts of the state and provide connections between communities in addition to the roads and railways radiating out from Melbourne. Parts of the Murray River Valley Road included a stretch of newly-constructed road between Mildura and the South Australian border, opened in 1927.

The passing of the Highways and Vehicles Act of 1924 through the Parliament of Victoria provided for the declaration of State Highways, roads two-thirds financed by the State government through the Country Roads Board (later VicRoads) in Victoria. Murray Valley Highway was declared a State Highway in September 1932, cobbled from a collection of existing and newly-constructed roads running along the southern bank of the Murray River from Corryong through Walwa, Wodonga, Cobram, Echuca, Swan Hill and Bannerton to the intersection with Calder Highway in Hattah, and again from Mildura to the state border with South Australian (for a total of 513 miles), and Renmark beyond.

Sturt Highway was rerouted to reach Renmark through Victoria instead of via Wentworth in 1939, subsuming the alignment of the Murray Valley Highway between Mildura and the state border with South Australia; it was subsequently truncated to terminate at Calder Highway in Hattah. Robinvale Road, a 2-mile road connecting the "irrigation settlement of Robinvale" to the highway, was declared a Main Road when it was surfaced for the first time in 1952, and later declared a State Highway as Robinvale Highway in June 1983, between Robinvale and Lake Powell.

The alignment was further altered at both ends in 1990:
its western end, running from Lake Powell via Bannerton to Hattah, was re-aligned to run through Robinvale along Robinvale Highway instead, subsuming it to terminate just outside Euston, New South Wales in May 1990; the former alignment is now known as Hattah-Robinvale Road (signed route C252 in 1998). 
its eastern end, running through Thologolong, Walwa and Towong, was re-aligned to run along the more-direct, present-day route to Corryong (at the time named Tallangatta-Corryong Road) in June 1990; the former alignment is now known as Murray River Road (signed route C546 in 1998). 

The passing of the Road Management Act 2004 granted the responsibility of overall management and development of Victoria's major arterial roads to VicRoads: in 2004, VicRoads re-declared the road as Murray Valley Highway (Arterial #6570), beginning at the New South Wales border at Robinvale and ending at the New South Wales border in Towong Upper.

The passing of the Main Roads (Amendment) Act of 1929 (which amended the original Main Roads Act of 1924) through the Parliament of New South Wales on 8 April 1929 provided for the declaration of State Highways, Trunk Roads and Main Roads, partially funded by the State government through the Main Roads Board (later the Department of Main Roads, and eventually Transport for NSW) in New South Wales. Main Road 583 was declared on 17 June 1959, from the intersection with State Highway 14 (Sturt Highway) at Euston to the state border with Victoria north of Robinvale; this declaration as a Main Road did not change when the road on the Victorian side of the bridge was declared a State Highway (as Robinvale Highway in 1983 and then Murray Valley Highway in 1990), despite adopting its name as Murray Valley Highway from the Victorian side of the road to remain contiguous. The road today, as Main Road 583, still retains this declaration.

Murray Valley Highway was signed National Route 16 across its entire length in 1955. With Victoria's conversion to the newer alphanumeric system in the late 1990s, its former route number was replaced by route B400 for the highway within Victoria; the New South Wales section was left signed as National Route 16 until switching to their alphanumeric system in 2013, after which it was left unallocated.

Upgrades
Major roadworks have recently taken place around Echuca and Moama and are continuing. The project is being built in four stages:
 Stage 1: Upgrade of the Murray Valley Highway and Warren Street intersection, completed in mid-2018
 Stage 2: Warren Street upgrade, completed November 2019
 Stage 3: Construction of new bridges over the Campaspe and Murray Rivers, major works started in March 2020
 Stage 4: Intersection upgrades to the Cobb Highway, Meninya Street and Perricoota Road intersection (to be delivered by Transport for NSW), works started in March 2020.

The project is due for completion in mid-2022.

Major intersections and towns

See also

 Highways in Australia
 Highways in New South Wales
 Highways in Victoria

References

Highways in Australia
Highways in Victoria (Australia)
Highways in New South Wales
Riverina